Ivanhoe is a 1913 American silent adventure/drama film starring King Baggot, Leah Baird, Herbert Brenon, Evelyn Hope, and Walter Craven.

Directed by Herbert Brenon and produced by Carl Laemmle's Independent Moving Pictures after IMP was absorbed into the newly founded Universal, which was the distributor, the screenplay was adapted by Brenon based on the epic 1819 historical novel of the same title by Sir Walter Scott.

One of the first expeditions abroad, Ivanhoe was filmed on location in the United Kingdom.

A copy of this early feature length production is preserved at the Museum of Modern Art in Midtown Manhattan, New York City.

Synopsis
Set in late 12th century England, this silent adventure is filled with pageantry and excitement as it chronicles the star-crossed love between a dashing knight and a beautiful Jewish maiden.

Wilfred of Ivanhoe (played by King Baggot), son of Sir Cedric (played by Wallace Bosco), returns to England from the Crusades in the Holy Land. As Ivanhoe, disguised, discovers that his beloved Lady Rowena (played by Evelyn Hope) has remained faithful, two weary travelers, Isaac of York (played by Herbert Brenon) and his pretty daughter Rebecca (played by Leah Baird), are admitted to Sir Cedric's castle, but after the knights learn that Isaac has money they abduct the visitors to the Norman stronghold of Torquilstone Castle.

When Ivanhoe realizes that Sir Cedric and Rowena have also been captured, he enters the forest, where he meets Robin Hood (played by Walter Thomas) and the Black Knight, actually King Richard, the Lion-Hearted (played by Walter Craven). Their band defeats de Bois in battle, but the villain escapes with Rebecca, later charging her with sorcery.

As Ivanhoe defeats de Bois in single combat, King Richard arrives, revealing his identity and reclaiming the crown from his traitorous brother, Prince John (played by George Courtenay).

Sadly, Rebecca must undergo a period of suffering, as well as come to terms with the loss of the man she loves, and witness the nuptials of her gallant Ivanhoe and the beautiful Rowena.

Cast
King Baggot as Wilfred of Ivanhoe 
Leah Baird as Rebecca of York
Herbert Brenon as Isaac of York
Evelyn Hope as Lady Rowena
Walter Craven as Richard, the Lion-Hearted
Wallace Widdicombe as Sir Brian de Bois - Guilbert
Walter Thomas as Robin Hood
Wallace Bosco as Sir Cedric, Ivanhoe's Father
Helen Downing as Elgitha
Jack Bates as Reginald Front-de Boeuf
R. Hollies as Friar Tuck
George Courtenay as Prince John
William Calvert as Gurth
A. J. Charlwood as Athelstane
Maurice Norman as Wamba, the Jester

External links

Ivanhoe at the Internet Movie Database
Ivanhoe at the Turner Classic Movies Database

1913 films
American silent feature films
American black-and-white films
American adventure drama films
American romantic drama films
American swashbuckler films
Films based on Ivanhoe
Films directed by Herbert Brenon
Universal Pictures films
1910s adventure drama films
1913 romantic drama films
Cultural depictions of Richard I of England
Cultural depictions of John, King of England
1910s historical adventure films
American historical adventure films
1910s American films
Silent romantic drama films
Silent adventure drama films
Silent American drama films
Silent historical adventure films